Blanche Hillyard defeated Miss Howes 6–1, 6–2 in the All Comers' Final, and then the reigning champion Lottie Dod defeated Hillyard 6–3, 6–3 in the challenge round to win the ladies' singles tennis title at the 1888 Wimbledon Championships.

Draw

Challenge round

All Comers'

References

External links

Ladies' Singles
Wimbledon Championship by year – Women's singles
Wimbledon Championships - Singles
Wimbledon Championships - Singles